Wild, Wonderful Purgatory is the second studio album by stoner rock band Karma to Burn. The album was released on May 31, 1999 (Europe) by Roadrunner UK, and July 7, 1999 (North America) by MIA Records. The album was reissued on March 18, 2022 by Heavy Psych Sounds Records.

It is their first fully instrumental album after the departure of former vocalist Jason Jarosz; a style they would keep for most subsequent releases. The album title refers to the West Virginia slogan, "Wild and Wonderful".

Track listing

Personnel
William Mecum – guitar
Rich Mullins – bass
Rob Oswald – drums

Notes 
The tracks "Twenty Nine" and "Thirty Two" appeared on the soundtrack of the 2000 EA Sports video game NASCAR 2001.

References

1999 albums
Karma to Burn albums
Roadrunner Records albums
Instrumental rock albums